Football Club Arzignano Valchiampo is an Italian football club based in Arzignano. Currently it plays in Italy's Serie C.

History
The club was founded in 2011 after the merger between U.S.D Chiampo founded in 1963 and U.S.D. G.M. Arzignano.  This last club was founded in 2005 with the merger between A.C. Arzignano and U.S.D Garcia Moreno.

The team was promoted to Serie D after the victory with Catania San Pio X in the play-off between the two semi-finalists of Coppa Italia Dilettanti. This was followed by the club winning promotion to Serie C as Serie D league champions in the 2018–19 season, under the guidance of Daniele Di Donato. They were successively relegated back to Serie D after only one season, then winning promotion back to the Italian third tier on their second attempt in 2021–22.

Colors and badge
The team's colors are yellow and light blue.

Current squad
.

Out on loan

References

External links
Official Site

Football clubs in Italy
Association football clubs established in 2011
Football clubs in Veneto
2011 establishments in Italy